The Downtown Wilkesboro Historic District in Wilkesboro, North Carolina is a  historic district that was listed on the National Register of Historic Places in 2009.  It included 69 contributing buildings, two contributing sites and one contributing object.  It includes architecture by Wheeler, McMichael and Co.

The district includes the Wilkes County Courthouse, a 1902 Beaux-Arts/Classical Revival style building by Charlotte-based architects Wheeler & Runge.  The building is large, brick and has a "tetrastyle Ionic portico and Second Empire cupola dominates the Courthouse Square and its surroundings and serves as a major landmark in the town as well as in Wilkes County."

Gallery

References

Historic districts on the National Register of Historic Places in North Carolina
Queen Anne architecture in North Carolina
Colonial Revival architecture in North Carolina
Geography of Wilkes County, North Carolina
National Register of Historic Places in Wilkes County, North Carolina